The Sarasota Rookie League was a minor baseball league that played in  as a Rookie level league. All league games were played in Sarasota, Florida. The 1964 Cocoa Rookie League operated simultaneously with the Sarasota Rookie League.

History
The four–team Sarasota Rookie League formed for the 1964 season. League teams played a 59–game schedule, beginning play on July 1, 1964 and ending on August 31, 1964.

The Sarasota Rookie League and Cocoa Rookie League were formed simultaneously in 1964. The new concept was to provide leagues with a short–season schedule that provided attendance options for fans and to assist major league teams in developing beginning professional players while further utilizing spring training facilities. Today, the Florida Complex League continues play under the concept initiated in 1964.

The four Sarasota Rookie League teams were minor league affiliates of the Chicago White Sox, Milwaukee Braves, New York Yankees and St. Louis Cardinals. All league games were played in Sarasota, Florida, with teams taking the nickname of their affiliate.

Sarasota Rookie League games were hosted at Payne Park, which was called "Arthur Allyn Park" at the time and contained multiple ballfields. Arthur Allyn was the owner of the Chicago White Sox in 1964 when the league began play. Allyn was highly supportive of the rookie league concept.

The Sarasota Rookie League began play on July 1, 1964, with two games scheduled at 11:15 AM and played simultaneously at Arthur Allyn Park.

Player salaries in the league were between $400 and $500 per month.

The SRL Braves, playing under manager Paul Snyder, won the championship with a 36–23 record. The Braves finished 6.5 games ahead of the 2nd place SRL Cardinals in the final standings.

Leora Montgomery of the SRL Braves was chosen as the league most valuable player.

Following the 1964 season, the Sarasota Rookie League evolved into the six–team Florida Rookie League in 1965.

1964 Sarasota Rookie League teams
SRL Braves
SRL Cardinals
SRL White Sox
SRL Yankees

Standings & statistics
1964 Sarasota Rookie League

References

Defunct minor baseball leagues in the United States
Baseball leagues in Florida
Sports leagues established in 1964
Sports leagues disestablished in 1964
Sarasota, Florida